Carl Poelker is a former American football, wrestling, and track and field coach.  He served as head football coach at Millikin University from 1982 to 1995 and at McKendree University from 1996 to 2012, compiling a career college football coaching record of 205–100–1.  Poelker graduated from Millikin in 1968. There he lettered on the football team for three seasons as a defensive lineman.  He also played basketball for two years and ran track for one.  In 1973 he was a named an instructor in physical education, defensive coordinator for the football team, and head wrestling coach at his alma mater.

Head coaching record

Football

See also
 List of college football coaches with 200 wins

References

Year of birth missing (living people)
Living people
American football defensive linemen
McKendree Bearcats football coaches
Millikin Big Blue football coaches
Millikin Big Blue football players
Millikin Big Blue men's basketball players
College men's track and field athletes in the United States
College track and field coaches in the United States
College wrestling coaches in the United States
High school basketball coaches in the United States
American men's basketball players